A sequence related amplified polymorphism (SRAP) is a molecular technique, developed by G. Li and C. F. Quiros in 2001, for detecting genetic variation in the open reading frames (ORFs) of genomes of plants and related organisms.

See also
 Inclusive composite interval mapping
 Microsatellite (genetics)
 Molecular computational identification
 Molecular marker
 RAPD
 Sequence profiling tool

References

Sources

Further reading
Books

 
 

Articles and journals

 
 
 
 
 
 
 
 
 
 
 
 
 
 

Authentication methods
Genetic mapping
Genomics
Molecular genetics
Repetitive DNA sequences
Statistical genetics